Elliott ALGOL is a compiler for the programming language ALGOL 60, for the Elliott 803 computer made by Elliott Brothers in the United Kingdom. It was implemented by Tony Hoare and others. It differed slightly from the reference version of ALGOL, particularly in the supported character set. First released in February 1962, it is believed to be the first implementation of an ALGOL 60 compiler in a commercial context and was an unexpectedly popular product for the company.

References

ALGOL 60 dialect
Systems programming languages
Procedural programming languages
Programming languages created in 1962